Pancalia isshikii is a moth in the family Cosmopterigidae. It is found on the islands of Hokkaido and Honshu of Japan and Russia.

References

Moths described in 1931
Antequerinae